is a Japanese manga series written and illustrated by Kimio Yanagisawa. A television drama was aired on TV Asahi in 2003, the official English name of the drama is Hitoshi Tadano, the Extraordinary Undercover Detective. A new drama series started airing in 2012 as Detective Anonymous.

Manga volumes
There are two series: Tokumei Kakarichō Tadano Hitoshi (9 volumes, or tankōbon, published from December 14, 2000 to June 15, 2001) and Shin Tokumei Kakarichō Tadano Hitoshi (20 volumes, published from May 27, 2002 to October 25, 2007). They were published by Kadokawa Shoten and Bunkasha, and were serialized in Weekly Gendai, a weekly manga magazine targeting salarymen.
Tokumei Kakarichō Tadano Hitoshi 1, 
Tokumei Kakarichō Tadano Hitoshi 2,  
Tokumei Kakarichō Tadano Hitoshi 3, 
Tokumei Kakarichō Tadano Hitoshi 4, 
Tokumei Kakarichō Tadano Hitoshi 5, 
Tokumei Kakarichō Tadano Hitoshi 6, 
Tokumei Kakarichō Tadano Hitoshi 7, 
Tokumei Kakarichō Tadano Hitoshi 8, 
Tokumei Kakarichō Tadano Hitoshi 9, 
Shin Tokumei Kakarichō Tadano Hitoshi 1,  
Shin Tokumei Kakarichō Tadano Hitoshi 2,  
Shin Tokumei Kakarichō Tadano Hitoshi 3,  
Shin Tokumei Kakarichō Tadano Hitoshi 4,  
Shin Tokumei Kakarichō Tadano Hitoshi 5,  
Shin Tokumei Kakarichō Tadano Hitoshi 6,  
Shin Tokumei Kakarichō Tadano Hitoshi 7,

TV drama

The first TV series broadcast on TV Asahi's "Friday Night Drama" slot from July 4, 2003 until September 19, 2003, and garnered an average rating of 12.0%, reaching a high point of 14.1% according to the Kantō Area Video Research group, the highest rating of any show in the "Friday Night Drama" slot. During the final episode of the first series, viewers were told that Tadano and Moriwaki were going to take a 15-month vacation traveling around to various onsen across Japan. A special titled Tokumei Kakarichō Tadano Hitoshi Returns was aired on December 22, 2004, just over 15 months since the final episode of the first series.

On January 14, 2005, the second series began airing, running through March 18, 2005. According to the Kantō Area Video Research group, the series achieved a 16.0% rating with the episodes airing on February 11 and 18. The final episode garnered a rating of over 20% in its timeslot, due largely to the main character, Tadano, collapsing during the episode due to being overworked. On August 7, 2005, the second special was aired, titled Nerawareta Serebu na Onna-tachi. The special garnered a 19.3%, the second highest rating ever for a drama, and making it the most popular drama aired between August 1 and 7.

The third series began airing January 12, 2007.

While in the original manga Tadano is a "lone wolf", in the TV series he works in combination with Moriwaki, a character created for the TV series. Moriwaki has now made his appearance in the original manga.

Based on a comic by Kimio Yanagisawa, Tokumei Kakaricho Tadano Hitoshi is a story about salaried worker who leads a double life as inept manager at the company, but moonlights as a heavy for the chairman of the company, investigating corruption within and outside of the company.

Jin Tadano (Katsunori Takahashi) is an assistant manager of operations department. Most people calls him Hitoshi Tadano because Jin can be read as Hitoshi, and this rhymes with Tadano Hito (an ordinary person). He pretends to be useless employee, but that's just a guise to hide his true function within the company. He's really like a ninja working for the chairman of the Denoudo corporation, always on a secret assignment to protect the people and the projects that the company is involved with. He is looked down by most of his fellow employees as useless oaf, but few girls likes him for who he is. This includes the secretary of the chairman Noriko Tsubouchi (Atsuko Sakurai), TV broadcaster Mayuko Shinmizu (Rieko Miura), and his coworker Kazue Yamabuki (Yuri Ebihara).

In each episode he's involved in solving corruption, murder, kidnapping, and all sorts of problems the company and its clients gets involved with. The program is made for adult audience, and was aired during late night time slot. The theme and characters that appears in the story reflects this. There're humor, action, some sexuality, and intrigue that makes this an excellent drama series coming out of Japan.

References

External links
 
 
 

2000 manga
2002 manga
2003 Japanese television series debuts
2008 Japanese television series endings
Business in anime and manga
Drama anime and manga
Japanese television dramas based on manga
Kadokawa Shoten manga
Kadokawa Dwango franchises
TV Asahi television dramas
Manga adapted into television series